Maya Morsy is an Egyptian political scientist and specialist in public policy and an advocate for Women and Human Rights. She is an elected President of Egypt's National Council for Women (NCW) on 1 February 2016 to Date as the third and the youngest President of the NCW since it was established in 2000 (Ministerial Decree). The National Women Machinery of Egypt an independent body by law and constitution reporting to the President of Egypt, since February 2016. Before she was elected to lead the NCW, Morsy served as regional gender team leader for the Regional bureau of United Nations Development Programme in New York City and  Regional Center in Amman before she served as the Country Manager for the United Nations Development Fund for Women. She has been described as "one of the best public policy experts on social gender in Egypt, and perhaps even in all of the Arab world".

The NCW was created in 2000 by Egypt's former president, Hosni Mubarak, and led by Suzanne Mubarak. Its board was restructured after the Egyptian revolution of 2011 and reorganized in 2012.
Mrs. Morsy lost her son "Ameen" in January 2020.

Education
Morsy obtained a BA in political science from the American University in Cairo in 1995, an MBA from the City University of Seattle in 1997, and an MA in public administration from Seattle in 1998. In 2008 she received a PhD in public policy from the Institute of Arab Research and Studies in Cairo.

Career
In her capacity as President of NCW in Egypt, Morsy is also head of the executive council of the Arab Women Organization Current President of the Ministerial Council of Women Development Organization and Chair of the Executive Bureau of the Women Development Organization of the Member states of the Organisation of Islamic Cooperation. 

For more than 26 years, Morsy has been working for national, regional and international organizations, including the National Council for Women, the United Nations, USAID, academic institutions, and the private sector.  The work experience has strengthened the strategic partnership with the League of Arab States, European Union, Organization of Islamic Cooperation, African Union, Union for the Mediterranean, government organizations, civil society, academic institutions and private sector. 

Morsy worked as a project officer in Egypt in the Sustainable Human Development Platform for Action and Monitoring (1995–1998), and as an academic facilitator for the City University of Seattle and the Arab Academy of Science and Technology (1997–1998). She was a consultant for the Girls Education and Empowerment Project of the Egyptian Ministry of Education (1998–1999); a project coordinator for the United Nations Development Fund for Women (UNIFEM) (1999–2000); and UNIFEM's country program manager (2000–2013). In 2014–2015 she served as the United Nations Development Programme's regional gender team leader for the Arab Region.

Morsy also managed and led more than 50 programs and authored more than 40 training manuals, books, articles, research and policy papers in areas of public policy, development, gender equality and women’s empowerment, peace and security, human security, finance for development.

Morsy led the process of the Egypt’s National Strategy for the Empowerment of Women 2030 as the first strategy adopted by the President of Egypt and the First Strategy globally aligned with the UN's Sustainable development goals agenda. 

During COVID19 pandemic, Morsy also published Egypt's rapid response to women's situation during COVID19 Outbreak, which is the first policy note globally to be issued on considering women's needs during the pandemic. She also managed to issue 4 editions of the first ever Women Policy Tracker to track and monitor gender sensitive Government responses in Egypt. 

During her time, Egypt took first place among countries within North Africa & Western Asia region to consider women needs during COVID19, according to a global report issued by UNDP and UNWOMEN.

And in September 2021 Morsy also led the establishment of UNDP  Egypt's Human Development Report 2021: Egypt Pathways and Prospects  in her capacity as the rapporteur of its 2021 version.

See also
Women in Egypt

References

Further reading
"Maya Morsi", Enigma magazine.

The American University in Cairo alumni
City University of Seattle alumni
21st-century Egyptian women politicians
21st-century Egyptian politicians
Living people
Year of birth missing (living people)